Collocheres elegans is a species of copepod in the family Asterocheridae. It is found in the British Isles and West Norway.

It is infesting Ophiocomina nigra, the black brittle star, in the Firth of Clyde, Scotland.

References

External links 

 
 Collocheres elegans at insectoid.info
 Collocheres elegans at the World Register of Marine Species (WoRMS)

Siphonostomatoida
Crustaceans described in 1896